Streptomyces bullii is a bacterium species from the genus of Streptomyces which has been isolated from soil from the Atacama Desert in Salar de Atacama in Chile.

See also 
 List of Streptomyces species

References

Further reading

External links
Type strain of Streptomyces bullii at BacDive – the Bacterial Diversity Metadatabase

bullii
Bacteria described in 2013